Abel Bliss, Jr. was born on August 8, 1853. His father, Abel Bliss, Sr., was a native of Wilbraham, Massachusetts, and was born on February 9, 1810. His mother was Lucinda Blake, a native of the Bay State and born in Springfield, Illinois, October 14, 1816. He was the sixth of the seven children born into his family, and attended high school at Englewood, and afterward was a student of engineering at University of Illinois at Urbana–Champaign. He was married, on February 21, 1877, to Nettie Lynk. He gave up engineering partway through his degree, due to circumstances that required him to take charge of the family farm, where he grew wealthy through his agricultural business and real estate investments. In June 1874, the University granted him a partial certificate in civil engineering. His business ventures included agriculture and real estate, and by 1929, he was a partner in the land development and oil production company of Bliss & Wetherbee. Mr. Bliss died in the mid-1930s.

Abel Bliss Professorship

Helen Eva Bliss, the daughter of Abel Bliss Jr., graduated from the University of Illinois in 1911 with a degree in Liberal Arts and Sciences.  After her retirement from working life, she established The Bliss Professor of Engineering in memory of her father.  Part of the Bliss bequest was earmarked to support the Grainger Engineering Library and Information Center Endowment, and the remainder towards other projects for “advancing the scholastic activities of the School of Engineering.”   The bequest was so generous that it currently sustains several professorships annually at the School of Engineering, University of Illinois.

The Abel Bliss Professorship has been awarded to individuals such as Jiawei Han (computer science), Rashid Bashir (semiconductors, MEMS, and Biosensors),  William P. King  (Materials Science), Stephen A. Boppart (Bioengineering and Internal Medicine), Kent D. Choquette   (vertical-cavity surface-emitting lasers), Philippe H. Geubelle  (Aerospace Engineering), David Ruzic (Plasma Engineering),  Albert J. Valocchi (water resources engineering, groundwater hydrology and contaminant transport), Elyse Rosenbaum (Bliss Faculty Scholar Award), Rob A. Rutenbar  (computer science and computer engineering), and Deming Chen (Electrical and Computer Engineering), all of whom are currently researching further technologies at the University of Illinois.

See also

 List of engineering awards

References

1853 births

1930s deaths
Philanthropy in the United States
Grainger College of Engineering alumni
Year of death missing